The following outline is provided as an overview of and topical guide to the Faroe Islands:

Faroe Islands – autonomous province of the Kingdom of Denmark comprising the Faroe archipelago in the North Atlantic Ocean.  The Faroe Islands are located between the Norwegian Sea and the North Atlantic Ocean, roughly equidistant between Iceland, Scotland, and Norway, and are considered a part of Northern Europe.

General reference

 Pronunciation:  
 Common English country names: The Faroe Islands, the Faroes, or the Faeroes
 Official English country name: The Faroe Islands of the Kingdom of Denmark
 Common endonym(s): Føroyar
 Official endonym(s): Føroyar
 Adjectival:  Faroe, Faroese
 Demonym(s):
 Etymology: Name of the Faroe Islands
 ISO country codes: FO, FRO, 234
 ISO region codes: See ISO 3166-2:FO
 Internet country code top-level domain: .fo

Geography of the Faroe Islands 

Geography of the Faroe Islands
 The Faroe Islands are: a dependent territory (specifically, self-governing overseas administrative division of) Denmark
 Location:
 Northern Hemisphere and Western Hemisphere
 Eurasia
 Europe
 Northern Europe
 Atlantic Ocean
 Norwegian Sea
 Time zone:  Western European Time (UTC+00), Western European Summer Time (UTC+01)
 Extreme points of the Faroe Islands
 High:  Slættaratindur 
 Low:  North Atlantic Ocean 0 m
 Land boundaries:  none
 Coastline:  1,117 km
 Population of the Faroe Islands:
 Area of the Faroe Islands:
 Atlas of the Faroe Islands

Environment of the Faroe Islands 

 Climate of the Faroe Islands
 Geology of the Faroe Islands
 Wildlife of the Faroe Islands
 Flora of the Faroe Islands
 Fauna of the Faroe Islands
 Birds of the Faroe Islands
 Mammals of the Faroe Islands

Natural geographic features of the Faroe Islands 
 Islands of the Faroe Islands
 Lakes of the Faroe Islands
 Mountains of the Faroe Islands
 World Heritage Sites in the Faroe Islands: None

Regions of the Faroe Islands 

Regions of the Faroe Islands

Administrative divisions of the Faroe Islands 

Administrative divisions of the Faroe Islands
 Regions of the Faroe Islands
 Municipalities of the Faroe Islands

Regions of the Faroe Islands 

Regions of the Faroe Islands

Municipalities of the Faroe Islands 

Municipalities of the Faroe Islands
 Capital of the Faroe Islands: Tórshavn
 Cities of the Faroe Islands

Demography of the Faroe Islands 

Demographics of the Faroe Islands

Government and politics of the Faroe Islands 

Politics of the Faroe Islands
 Form of government: parliamentary representative democratic dependency
 Capital of the Faroe Islands: Tórshavn
 Elections in the Faroe Islands
 Parliamentary elections
 
 Danish elections
 
 Referendums
 1946 Faroese independence referendum
 2009 Danish Act of Succession referendum
 Political parties in the Faroe Islands

Branches of the government of the Faroe Islands 

Government of the Faroe Islands

Executive branch of the government of the Faroe Islands 
 Head of state: Queen of Denmark, Queen Margrethe II, represented by High Commissioner of the Faroe Islands, Dan M. Knudsen
 Head of government: Prime Minister of the Faroe Islands, Kaj Leo Johannesen

Legislative branch of the government of the Faroe Islands 

 Parliament of the Faroe Islands (Løgting) (unicameral)

Judicial branch of the government of the Faroe Islands 

 Courts of Denmark – judicially, the Faroe Islands are under the jurisdiction of Denmark's court system.

Foreign relations of the Faroe Islands 

Foreign relations of the Faroe Islands
 Diplomatic missions of the Faroe Islands
 Danish Realm

International organization membership 
The government of the Faroe Islands is a member of:
Arctic Council
Food and Agriculture Organization (FAO)
International Maritime Organization (IMO) (associate)
Nordic Council (NC)
Nordic Investment Bank (NIB)
Universal Postal Union (UPU)

Law and order in the Faroe Islands 

 Capital punishment in the Faroe Islands: none
 Constitution of the Faroe Islands
 Human rights in the Faroe Islands
 LGBT rights in the Faroe Islands
 Recognition of same-sex unions in the Faroe Islands
 Law enforcement in the Faroe Islands

Military of the Faroe Islands 

Military of the Faroe Islands
 Command: Island Command Faroes is the de facto defense command
 Forces
 Army: none, Defense is the responsibility of Denmark
 Navy: none, Defense is the responsibility of Denmark
 Air Force: none, Defense is the responsibility of Denmark
 Special forces: none, Defense is the responsibility of Denmark

Local government in the Faroe Islands 

List of municipalities of the Faroe Islands

History of the Faroe Islands 

History of the Faroe Islands

Culture of the Faroe Islands 

Culture of the Faroe Islands

 Cuisine of the Faroe Islands
 Languages of the Faroe Islands
 Media in the Faroe Islands
 List of museums in the Faroe Islands
 National symbols of the Faroe Islands
 Coat of arms of the Faroe Islands
 Flag of the Faroe Islands
 National anthem of the Faroe Islands
 World Heritage Sites in the Faroe Islands: None

Art in the Faroe Islands 
 Cinema of the Faroe Islands
 Literature of the Faroe Islands
 Music of the Faroe Islands
 Television in the Faroe Islands

Sports in the Faroe Islands 

 Football in the Faroe Islands

Education in the Faroe Islands 
Education in the Faroe Islands
University of the Faroe Islands
Centre of Maritime Studies and Engineering
Føroya Studentaskúli og HF-Skeið

Economy and infrastructure of the Faroe Islands 

Economy of the Faroe Islands
 Economic rank, by nominal GDP (2007): 157th (one hundred and fifty seventh)
 Communications in the Faroe Islands
 Internet in the Faroe Islands
 Companies of the Faroe Islands
Currency of the Faroe Islands: Króna/Krone
ISO 4217: DKK
 Transport in the Faroe Islands
 Airports in the Faroe Islands
 Rail transport in the Faroe Islands

See also 

Faroe Islands
List of international rankings
Outline of geography
Outline of Europe
Outline of Denmark
Outline of Greenland

References

External links

 
 Prime Minister's Office - Official site
 National Library of the Faroe Islands
 Faroe Islands Tourist Guide
 Gallery of stunning photos of the Faroe Islands
 Statistics - Data about the Faroese community
 Faroese banknote series Information about Faroese banknotes
 Visit Faroe Islands - Official tourist site
 Visit Klaksvik - Klaksvik local tourist site
 Framtak in the Faroe Islands - A comprehensive introduction to the Faroe Islands
 Faroeislands.dk - Is a private page covering all villages on the Faroe Islands
 Nordic House - Official site of the Nordic House in the Faroe Islands
  - March 2007 New York Times Travel section feature
 Guesthouse undir Fjalli - guesthouse accommodation in Torshavn
 Photographs of the Faroe Islands

Faroe Islands
Faroe Islands